The 2014 WEC 6 Hours of Spa-Francorchamps, formally known as the WEC 6 Heures de Spa-Francorchamps, was an endurance sports car racing event held at the Circuit de Spa-Francorchamps, Spa, Belgium on 2–3 May 2014.  Spa-Francorchamps served as the second race of the 2014 FIA World Endurance Championship.  Toyota's Anthony Davidson, Sébastien Buemi, and Nicolas Lapierre led the field to the checkered flag for their second consecutive victory of the season, ahead of Audi and the sister Toyota.  The LMP2 category also had its second consecutive winner with G-Drive Racing ahead of Jota Sport's guest entry in the series.  AF Corse Ferrari held off Porsche Team Manthey in the LMGTE Pro class, while another AF Corse Ferrari won the LMGTE Am category ahead of two Aston Martins.

Qualifying

Qualifying result
Pole position winners in each class are marked in bold.

 – The No. 37 SMP Racing Oreca-Nissan was allowed to grid at the back of the LMP field.

Race

Race result
Class winners in bold.

References

Spa-Francorchamps
Spa-Francorchamps
6 Hours of Spa-Francorchamps